José 'Zé' Nuno Freire de Silva Azevedo (born 19 July 1969) is a Portuguese former footballer who played as a right back, and is the manager of Grupo Desportivo Prado.

Club career
Born in Paranhos (Porto), Azevedo started his professional career with C.F. União de Lamas in the Segunda Liga, joining amateurs F.C. Famalicão one year later and eventually catching the eye of Gil Vicente F.C. also of the second level, signing in 1989.

After three seasons in Barcelos, Azevedo joined S.C. Braga where he would see out his career, often being an undisputed starter and retiring at the age of 34.

References

External links

1969 births
Living people
Footballers from Porto
Portuguese footballers
Association football defenders
Primeira Liga players
Liga Portugal 2 players
Segunda Divisão players
C.F. União de Lamas players
F.C. Famalicão players
Gil Vicente F.C. players
S.C. Braga players
S.C. Braga B players
Portugal under-21 international footballers
Portuguese football managers